Sonailtala Union is a union parishad of Mongla Upazila, Bagerhat District in Khulna Division of Bangladesh. It has an area of 39.00 km2 (15.06 sq mi) and a population of 9,854.

References

Unions of Mongla Upazila
Unions of Bagerhat District
Unions of Khulna Division